Marcelis Branch (born January 19, 1994) is an American football safety for the Calgary Stampeders of the Canadian Football League (CFL). He played college football at Robert Morris University.

Professional career

Atlanta Falcons
Branch signed with the Atlanta Falcons as an undrafted free agent on May 1, 2017. He was waived by the Falcons on September 2, 2017, but was signed to the practice squad the next day. He signed a reserve/future contract with the Falcons on January 15, 2018.

On September 1, 2018, Branch was waived by the Falcons.

Pittsburgh Steelers
On January 16, 2019, Branch signed a reserve/future contract with the Pittsburgh Steelers. He was waived on August 31, 2019.

Tampa Bay Vipers
Branch was drafted in the 5th round during phase four in the 2020 XFL Draft by the Tampa Bay Vipers. He had his contract terminated when the league suspended operations on April 10, 2020. Branch was selected by the Alphas of The Spring League during its player selection draft on October 12, 2020.

Calgary Stampeders
Branch signed with the Calgary Stampeders of the CFL on February 1, 2021.

References

External links
Robert Morris Colonials bio

1994 births
Living people
American football safeties
Atlanta Falcons players
Calgary Stampeders players
People from Homestead, Florida
Pittsburgh Steelers players
Players of American football from Florida
Robert Morris Colonials football players
Sportspeople from Miami-Dade County, Florida
Tampa Bay Vipers players
The Spring League players